Ancylocera spinula is a species of beetle in the family Cerambycidae. It was described by Monné & Napp in 2001.

References

Ancylocera
Beetles described in 2001